The Bighead River is a river in Grey County in southern Ontario, Canada, that flows from the Niagara Escarpment between the communities along Ontario Highway 10 of Arnott and Holland Centre in the township of Chatsworth to empty into Nottawasaga Bay, an inlet of Georgian Bay on Lake Huron, at Meaford.

The river crosses the Bruce Trail in the valley between the Spey River Forest Area and the Walters Falls Conservation Area.

Tributaries
East Minniehill Creek (right)
Minniehill Creek (right)
Rocklyn Creek (right)
Walters Creek (right)

See also
List of rivers of Ontario

References

Sources

External links
Grey Sauble Conservation Authority (southern Ontario)

Rivers of Grey County
Tributaries of Georgian Bay